Matthew C. Jacobson (born February 4, 1961) is an American political candidate and business executive. On May 7, 2009, Jacobson, a Republican, announced that he would seek the 2010 Republican nomination for Governor of Maine.

Career

Maine & Company
In 2006, Jacobson returned to Maine to become president and chief executive officer of Maine & Company, a non-profit corporation whose staff provides free and confidential services to companies locating to or growing in Maine, taking over for Joe Wischerath, who had served as CEO since Maine & Co. was founded in November 1995.

As the organization chief executive, Jacobson is responsible for developing and executing business attraction and expansion strategies.  To that end, he engages with corporate executives, state and local authorities, as well as other stakeholders.  Jacobson changed the organization's focus from a passive go between helping businesses already interested in coming to Maine, to one which actively courted specific companies to attract them to the state.

In his tenure, several major companies have relocated to the state.  Among these were NotifyMD, athenahealth and Boston Financial Data Services, which have contributed more than 1,500 new jobs to the state.  Jacobson himself has been credited with facilitating these moves, with Mainebiz specifically citing him as the reason athenahealth chose to move to Belfast, ME rather than Burlington, VT.

Maine Lobster Marketing Collaborative

In 2014 Jacobson was selected to lead the newly formed Maine Lobster Marketing Collaborative. According to the Bangor Daily News, "The Maine Lobster Marketing Collaborative was formed in 2013 to replace the Maine Lobster Promotion Council. The new entity has more representation for fishermen on the board and, more significantly, has a much bigger budget. The old council had an annual budget of a few hundred thousand dollars but the new entity will have a budget that will rise to $2.25 million by 2016. The increase in funding for the state’s lobster marketing efforts is necessary in order to compete with other global seafood marketing campaigns, industry officials have said."

2010 bid for Governor of Maine
Speculation surrounding potential candidates for Maine's 2010 gubernatorial election began to swirl in mid to late 2008, well before the year's presidential election. Jacobson's name was widely discussed for a potential bid for the Republican nomination as early as September, 2008, but he made no formal announcement regarding his interest until much later.

On February 26, 2009, Jacobson announced that he was forming an exploratory committee to examine the prospects of running for Governor of Maine.

On May 7, 2009, Jacobson made his candidacy official, announcing his run at the Ocean Gateway terminal in Portland.

On July 15, 2009, gubernatorial candidates filed their financial disclosures with the state's Ethics Commission.  Jacobson reported raising $38,290 with $10,008 cash on hand.

References

External links
Jacobson For Governor - Official Gubernatorial Campaign Site
Bangor Daily News - http://bangordailynews.com/2014/07/15/business/maine-lobster-marketing-entity-picks-matt-jacobson-as-first-chief/

1961 births
Living people
Chapman University alumni
Maine Republicans
Businesspeople from Maine
People from Cumberland, Maine
American chief operating officers